Lago Fanaco is an artificial lake in the Province of Palermo, Sicily, Italy. At an elevation of 680 m, its surface area is 1.38 km2. the municipality of Castronovo di Sicilia. The lake is 3.5 km long and 1 km wide at its widest point and can accommodate 20.7 million cubic meters at the maximum flooded height.

Wildlife 
Today Fanaco is a destination for many species of migratory birds, especially lapwings, royal seagulls, ducks, herons and little grebes. In the hills above the lake flourish thick vegetation of holm oaks, poplars, pines, cypresses and ash trees, gorse and euphorbia.

Lakes of Sicily